Jamtara is a city and a notified area in the Jamtara Sadar subdivision of the Jamtara district in the Indian state of Jharkhand. It is the headquarters of the eponymous district, subdivision and community development block.

It is also nicknamed the phishing capital of India. It got this title because there were numerous incidents of phishing across the country whose centre point was there. In the span of two years between April 2015 and March 2017, police from 12 Indian states reportedly made 23 journeys to Jamtara. They did so to investigate cybercrimes — primarily phishing that were emanating from one of the most underdeveloped districts, was responsible for 8 percent of them by some estimates. Those involved had bought luxury SUVs and put up fancy bungalows next to ramshackle cottages.

Geography

Location
It has an average elevation of 155 metres (508 feet).

It is located 250 km from Ranchi, the state capital and 54 km from Dhanbad the 'Coal Capital'. It has an area of 1801 km2.  Distance from other major cities like from Kolkata is 260 km and from Patna is 290 km.

It came into existence on 26 April 2001. This small district of Jharkhand state consists of only four blocks. It was created by carving out four blocks from Dumka District.

Other towns in this district are Karmatar, Nala, Kundahit, Narayanpur, Fatehpur and Mihijam. The Ajay River passes through the district and forest areas cover the district.

Overview
The map shows a large area, which is a plateau with low hills, except in the eastern portion where the Rajmahal hills intrude into this area and the Ramgarh hills are there. The south-western portion is just a rolling upland. The entire area is overwhelmingly rural with only small pockets of urbanisation.

Note: The full screen map is interesting. All places marked on the map are linked in the full screen map and one can easily move on to another page of his/her choice. Enlarge the full screen map to see what else is there – one gets railway connections, many more road connections and so on.

Tourism

A number of hotels and small guesthouses have come up that serve a variety of cuisines.

Parwat Vihar Park is located 5 km from Jamtara Railway Station. It is situated in the Northern Side of Jamtara.

Karamdaha temple of Dukhia Mahadev is situated 44 km from Jamtara railway station. A fair is held at this place every year from 14 January to 27 January.

Education
Educational institutions in Jamtara District Headquarters include:
 Secondary: JBC+2 High School, Girls High School, Savitri Devi DAV Public School+2,St.Joseph's School, St. Anthony, Edwards English School, Jamtara
 Higher Secondary: Kendriya Vidyalaya, Navodaya Vidyalaya, Jamtara college, Women's college
 Graduation: Jamtara College, Jamtara Mahila College.
 Technical Educational: Women's ITI & Government ITI institute

Demographics
 India census, Jamtara had a population of 29,415 with 89% Hindu & 10% Muslim. Males constituted 52% of the population and females 48%. Jamtara had an average literacy rate of 63.73%, lower than the national average of 74.4%: male literacy was 76.85%, and female literacy was 50.08%. In Jamtara, 13% of the population was under 6 years of age.

Languages

According to a 2011 census, Bengali was the most spoken language in Jamtara with 12,713 speakers followed by Hindi at 8,412, Khortha at 4,553 and Santali at 1,038.

Climate

 Summer season - March to May
 Rainy season - June to September
 Winter season - October to February
 Min temperature - 2 °C in Winter
 Max temperature - 45 °C in Summer
 Height above sea level - 
 Wind direction - south west to north east

In popular culture
Jamtara was featured in a Netflix show titled Jamtara – Sabka Number Ayega. The TV Show revolves around a group of small-town young men who run a lucrative phishing operation, until a corrupt politician wants in on their scheme and a cop wants to fight it.

See also
 Jamtara block

References

Jamtara